Sun Silo is a sculpture by Patrick Marold, installed in Denver's Community Park at East Lowry Boulevard and Pontiac Street, in the U.S. state of Colorado.

References

Outdoor sculptures in Denver